"California Feelin" is a song written by Brian Wilson and Stephen Kalinich that was recorded by the Beach Boys in the 1970s. Wilson recorded a solo version in 2002 for the Beach Boys compilation Classics Selected by Brian Wilson. Two composite versions of the Beach Boys' original recordings – one complete and the other a piano/vocal demo – were included on the 2013 compilation Made in California.

Background
The song was written by Brian Wilson and Stephen Kalinich for Wilson's American Spring side project. Kalinich considered the song white gospel and added "I think it frightened him a little to let his defenses down and give the vocal all he had." In 1976, Wilson said of the song, "It's got a feeling to it. ... There's something about it that's very warm. It's sort of a Bill Medley–Brian Wilson combination."

Recording
It was first tracked as a demo in November 1974 by Brian Wilson in a session that was engineered by Chuck Britz. Wilson, unhappy with his performance, instructed the engineer to scrap the tape, but this was not heeded. The Beach Boys' 1974 and 1978 versions of "California Feelin'" were eventually released for the 2013 compilation Made in California. Compiler Alan Boyd explained:

Music video
An official music video was released in 2014. It was the winner of a fan contest devised during the promotion of Made in California.

Personnel
Credits from Craig Slowinski

The Beach Boys
Al Jardine - backing vocals
Bruce Johnston - co-lead and backing vocals
Mike Love - backing vocals
Brian Wilson - lead (intro) and backing vocals, piano
Carl Wilson - lead and backing vocals, electric guitar

Additional musicians
Ed Carter - bass guitar
Bobby Figueroa - drums, tambourine
Carli Muñoz - Fender Rhodes
Phil Shenale - Oberheim synthesizers
Sterling Smith - Hammond organ

References

External links
 

Song recordings produced by Brian Wilson
Songs written by Brian Wilson
Songs written by Stephen Kalinich
The Beach Boys songs
2002 songs
Songs about California
Brian Wilson songs
Gospel songs
Songs released posthumously